The 2014–15 season was Port Vale's 103rd season of football in the English Football League, and second successive season in League One. Before the season began the club were listed as third favourites to be relegated by the bookies.

A run of six defeats resulted in a surprise resignation from manager Micky Adams on 18 September, and his assistant Rob Page took his place in the hot-seat. Chairman Norman Smurthwaite then initiated his plan for the club to sign young players to develop and later sell for profit at a later date. Vale exited the cups in the early stages after coming up against tough opposition, exiting the FA Cup at the hands of Milton Keynes Dons, losing to Cardiff City in the League Cup and Preston North End in the League Trophy. They climbed up the league table under Page, reaching the outskirts of the play-offs by the end of February before a late season collapse saw them finish in 18th place.

Overview

League One
Manager Micky Adams ended months of speculation surrounded his future when he signed a 12-month rolling contract the following in June 2014. His first signing of the season was versatile left-sided player Colin Daniel. Kaid Mohamed left the club on loan, after he agreed to spend the season playing for Northampton Town. Adams admitted he was finding it difficult to sign new players to take the club forward after losing out on numerous transfer targets to rival clubs. Chairman Norman Smurthwaite was criticised by fans for showing a lack of ambition, but Smurthwaite defended his record by pointing to falling season ticket sales and the high amount of time and money he had invested in the club without financial reward. The second signing of the season was 24-year-old full-back Ryan McGivern, who negotiated a release from relegated Scottish Premier League club Hibernian in order to sign a two-year contract with the Vale. The third arrival was winger Mark Marshall, who had spent the latter half of the previous campaign with Coventry City after serving a two-year ban for taking performance-enhancing drugs. His next signing was winger Byron Moore, who turned down a contract offer at nearby Crewe Alexandra to join the Vale. This capture raised the tensions between Vale and Crewe, particularly after Adams and Crewe boss Steve Davis had a spat over the departure of his son Joe Davis; his father claiming Vale's contract offer to Joe was "derisory". Adams looked at a number of players on trial over the summer, including: Michael O’Connor, Steve Jennings, Javan Vidal, and Sylvestre Guyonet. Adams completed his squad on 18 July with a triple signing, taking on a trio of experienced midfielders: Michael Brown, Steve Jennings, and Michael O'Connor. He took the squad on a pre-season tour of Cornwall, including a stay at HMS Raleigh. Adams added to the squad by taking in versatile right-back Frédéric Veseli on a long-term loan from Ipswich Town. Carl Dickinson was appointed as club captain in August 2014, taking the armband from the departed Doug Loft.

Vale opened the season with a 1–1 draw at home to Walsall, with young goalkeeper Sam Johnson being favoured ahead of Chris Neal. An excellent away win followed as Vale picked up a 3–1 win at newly relegated Doncaster Rovers. Adams said this performance was as good as he had seen in an away game during his time as Vale manager. They remained unbeaten after picking up a 1–1 draw with Oldham Athletic at Boundary Park. Their unbeaten start to the season came to an end with a 2–0 home defeat to Notts County, with the Vale unable to turn round a 1–0 half-time deficit despite a strong attacking performance in the second half. To boost his attacking options, Adams then took in Blackburn Rovers striker Jordan Slew on loan until January. However Adams went on to bemoan defensive errors as Chesterfield left Burslem with a 2–1 win following a bad-tempered encounter upon Daniel Jones's return to Vale Park. After the match opposition player Armand Gnanduillet was racially abused by a Vale supporter. Adams ended the month by signing French striker Achille Campion on loan from Swedish side Norrby IF.

A trip to London Road opened September for Vale, and Adams changed the team following the run of defeats, but league leaders Peterborough United proved too strong as they ran out 3–1 winners. The run of defeats was extended to five games on 13 September when local rivals Crewe Alexandra picked up their first points of the season. Following the defeat Adams told the media that his position would be under threat if results did not turn around quickly. Three days later league leaders Bristol City made it six defeats in a row by inflicting a 3–0 defeat on the Vale. This proved too much for Adams, who announced his resignation on 18 September. Rob Page stepped in as caretaker-manager initially "until the end of October". His first game in charge saw the Vale beat Barnsley 2–1, Mark Marshall providing a deserved late winner with a mazy penalty box run. At Bradford City former Valiant Billy Knott gave away a penalty which was converted by Chris Lines, but a Mark Yeates free-kick just before half-time levelled the scores. The defence was then bolstered with the signings of two loanee players: Guadeloupe international Stéphane Zubar from Bournemouth, and  Reiss Greenidge from West Bromwich Albion.

A trip to Fleetwood Town on 4 October proved fruitless after a late penalty gave Fleetwood a 1–0 win; Vale had played well and seemed to have done enough to earn a point despite playing much of the match with ten men after Slew was sent off for striking an opposition player. In search of a first clean sheet of the season, Page signed 19-year-old centre-back Remie Streete on loan from Newcastle United. Vale came out of the relegation zone on 11 October with a convincing 4–1 win over struggling Yeovil Town. A 2–0 defeat followed at Deepdale, with Zubar receiving a straight red card for lashing out at Preston North End's Joe Garner. After the game Page condemned Garner for play-acting throughout the match to try and get Vale player's sent off. The loan signings continued, as Leicester City's Saint Kitts and Nevis international striker Harry Panayiotou arrived on a one-month loan. The club were also in talks with former Premier League midfielder Isaiah Osbourne, who instead joined fellow relegation battlers Scunthorpe United. Ironically a few days later Scunthorpe then came to Burslem, as did the remnants of Hurricane Gonzalo, and the game ended 2–2 despite the Vale leading 2–1 and facing ten men after former player Jennison Myrie-Williams was sent off. The fifth signing of Page's reign then arrived in the form of French striker Dany N'Guessan, who signed a two-month deal. The signing came in good time as Tom Pope was later ruled out of action for a few weeks with a knee injury. Vale then beat Leyton Orient 3–0, keeping their first clean sheet of the season; Orient were reduced to ten men early in the first half after Darius Henderson was sent-off for elbowing Richard Duffy. Having taken the club up seven league places within six weeks, Page was appointed as manager on a permanent basis on 29 October.

Vale opened November with three points at Colchester United; Neal saved a first-half penalty before Marshall and Daniel secured the goals in a 2–1 win. The search for talented young players continued, with Aziz Deen-Conteh and Enoch Andoh both joining the club on a trial basis. The clash with Rochdale on 15 November came amidst a defensive crisis as Streete was recalled from his loan and both Duffy and McGivern were suspended. The positive results kept coming however, as Vale moved into the top half of the table with a 1–0 win. Former Chelsea left-back Aziz Deen-Conteh then signed a deal with the club until 2017. Leaving the club, though only on a 28-day loan, was goalkeeper Sam Johnson, who went to Conference Premier side Alfreton Town. Not long after their FA Cup triumph at Vale Park, Milton Keynes Dons hosted the Vale and ran out 1–0 following a sending off to Chris Lines. Another two long-term prospects were then added in the form of Ghana youth international Enoch Andoh, who signed an 18-month contract, and former Manchester City striker Alex Nimely. The "Valiants" then ended the month with a 2–2 draw at Gillingham, Brown's 94th-minute equalizer securing a deserved point.

After a two-week break Vale hosted Coventry City on 13 December, and went on to lose the game 2–0 after failing to pose much of an attacking threat. They got back to winning ways the following week by beating struggling Crawley Town 2–1. The visitors on Boxing Day were Sheffield United, who were defeated 2–1 after referee Stuart Attwell sent off "Blades" defender Chris Basham and later gave Vale a penalty. Another tricky tie followed at Swindon Town, who went into the automatic promotion places after beating Vale 1–0.

Vale began 2015 with a home tie against Gillingham, and a victory took them to within a point of the play-offs thanks to a stoppage time winner from Colin Daniel. Shortly after Frédéric Veseli's loan signing from Ipswich was made into a permanent deal. Going forward Page managed to adequately cover for the continuing absence of Pope by playing Ben Williamson as a lone striker supported by Louis Dodds in a central attacking midfield role. The next week's opponents, Chesterfield, were one place above Vale, but a 3–0 Chesterfield win put Vale four points and four places outside the play-offs; both chairman and manager described the performance as "embarrassing". This proved to be a temporary setback however, as Vale went on to beat Peterborough 2–1. A win over "A500 derby" rivals Crewe would then take Vale into the play-offs, but a 1–0 win completed a double over Vale for the "Railwaymen"; Neal saved a penalty he himself gave away but could not keep out Nicky Ajose's 39th-minute strike. Next opponents Barnsley tried to buy Tom Pope before Vale's visit to Oakwell. Pope played against Barnsley but it was goalkeeper Neal who opened the scoring after fumbling into his own net just before half-time; Barnsley went on to win the game 2–1. Pope stayed put throughout the remainder of the transfer window, instead it was N'Guessan who departed, whilst Tommy O'Sullivan and Greg Luer arrived on loan.

Vale twice came from behind at home to Bradford on 7 February, Campion scoring the first equalizer before City goalkeeper Jordan Pickford was sent off in stoppage time for bringing down Birchall; O'Connor converted the resulting penalty. A trip to league leaders Bristol City followed, who demonstrated their superiority over the Vale with a 3–1 win. To bolster the defence Page signed  teenage centre-back Ryan Inniss on a youth loan from Crystal Palace. The youngster made his debut at Walsall, helping Vale to a rare clean sheet as Tom Pope returned to the score-sheet. A second clean sheet followed in a 3–0 home win over Doncaster Rovers, as both Veseli and Moore opened their accounts with the club to complete the double over "Donny". A 1–0 win over Notts County extended the run of victories and clean sheets and took Vale to within three points of the play-offs.

March began poorly as managerless Oldham broke Vale's run of results with a 1–0 victory in a dour game. Vale then came from behind to win 3–2 at Coventry, moving themselves to within two points of the play-offs in the process. This proved to be Inniss's last game for the club, and Lines also left the club after the game, joining former club Bristol Rovers on loan. Swindon then dented Vale's promotion hopes with a 1–0 in Burslem, defending an eighth-minute lead from Brazilian defender Raphael Rossi Branco. Dodds twice put Vale ahead of Crawley, but the relegation threatened visitors came from behind to win the game 3–2 to effectively end Vale's play-off hopes in front of just 3,852 supporters. Page said the performance was "embarrassing". Pope was dropped for the trip to Bramall Lane, though came on at half-time during a 1–0 defeat to Sheffield United. On deadline loan deal day, Page made a triple signing: Portuguese winger Francisco Júnior (Everton), Scottish defender Neill Collins (Sheffield United), and Senegalese attacker Mohamed Coulibaly (Bournemouth). Francisco Júnior and Collins started at Leyton Orient, but a 1–0 lead turned into a 2–1 deficit following Chris Neal's sending off.

Second-from-bottom Colchester opened the Easter weekend with a 2–1 win at Vale Park, leaving Vale just four points above the relegation zone. Five changes were made for the trip to Rochdale, but a stoppage time goal from former Valiant Calvin Andrew condemned Vale to a sixth successive defeat. The run of defeats was ended with a 0–0 draw at home to third-place Milton Keynes Dons. Richard Duffy then scored the first goal of his Vale career against Scunthorpe and secured a draw that took the club over the 50 point mark; however a Kyle Wootton goal five minutes into stoppage time denied Vale the victory. Second-place Preston twice took the lead against Vale, but despite Duffy being sent off Vale came back with two Michael O'Connor penalties to claim an important point. Vale secured their League One status with 2–1 win at bottom-club Yeovil, ending a run of nine games without a win. This left the final game against Fleetwood as a formality, as Vale fell to a 2–1 defeat.

The first departure announced at the end of the campaign was from the coaching staff, with Mark Grew standing down after 25 years at Vale Park. Of the playing staff only three players were not offered new contracts: Chris Robertson, Kaid Mohamed and Alex Nimely. Star striker Tom Pope chose to leave the club, rejecting an offer of a 50% pay cut in favour of a move to newly promoted Bury. The next player to depart was strike partner Ben Williamson, who left for Gillingham. Chris Lines had his contract cancelled in order to join Bristol Rovers on a permanent basis and free up the wage budget for Page. Full-back Frédéric Veseli and star winger Mark Marshall also left the club after rejecting new contract offers.

Finances & ownership issues
PVFC Limited, the club's holding company, was hit with a winding-up order by HM Revenue and Customs in July 2014; chairman Norman Smurthwaite insisted this would not affect the club and that a funding error caused the problem and expected the order to be withdrawn. Smurthwaite continued to affect changes at the club, controversially axing the system of door-to-door lottery collectors and banishing the Port Vale Community Trust out of Vale Park; the charity subsequently was offered a rent-free tenancy at the Touch building in Trinity Street, Hanley by Vale supporter Jason Nixon who also stated that he had business contacts interested in buying the club.

Smurthwaite invested £500,000 into the playing budget in order to help Micky Adams strengthen the squad. Despite not wanting him to resign, once Adams left the club Smurthwaite initiated a policy of experimenting with young players in the hope of turning a profit from player sales in the future. Smurthwaite did cause controversy however by telling a reporter that supporters who only attended away matches (due partly to Vale Park's high ticket costs) "disgusted" him and that they should "go and support another club".

In February, the home game with Doncaster Rovers was put into doubt after Smurthwaite refused to pay extra policing costs that Staffordshire Police had demanded following intelligence that there would be troublemakers instigating violence at the game. Smurthwaite denied Staffordshire Police and Crime Commissioner Matthew Ellis's claim that Smurthwaite threatened to close the club down during the dispute, but retracted his threat to bar police officers from entering the ground during the match. Smurthwaite cancelled an expensive arranged loan deal for an unnamed Premier League player in March after being disappointment with low home attendances; he stated "I feel like I am banging my head against a brick wall with it all." An e-mail sent from Smurthwaite's account claimed that he was looking to sell the club and would invest no further money in the club, but he claimed his account had been hacked and that the e-mail was a hoax.

Cup competitions
A tricky draw in the First Round left Vale facing Milton Keynes Dons; the game proved to be an entertaining one, but despite Dany N'Guessan scoring two goals he ended up on the losing side as the Dons ran out 4–3 winners.

Vale made progress in the League Cup by beating League Two side Hartlepool United 6–2 in the First Round, Ben Williamson scoring a hat-trick within the space of ten minutes. Their Second Round opponents were newly relegated Championship side Cardiff City, who ran out 3–2 victors with former Manchester United striker Federico Macheda marking his debut with a brace; the highlight for Vale was a 40-yard goal from Michael O'Connor.

After a bye in the First Round of the Football League Trophy, Vale faced a tricky tie with Preston North End at Deepdale. Tom Pope cancelled out Chris Humphrey early strike, but the game was won in the 63rd minute by a deft chipped goal from Joe Garner, with Paul Gallagher and Tom Pope completing the scoring to make it 3–2 to the "Lambs".

Results

Pre-season

League One

League table

Results by matchday

Matches

FA Cup

League Cup

League Trophy

Squad statistics

Appearances and goals

Top scorers

Disciplinary record

Sourced from Soccerway.

Awards

Transfers

Transfers in

Transfers out

Loans in

Loans out

References
Specific

General
Soccerbase

Port Vale F.C. seasons
Port Vale